Paducah is the name of multiple places in the United States of America:

 Paducah, Kentucky, a city on the Ohio River
 Paducah, Texas, a small town named after the city in Kentucky
 Paducah micropolitan area, an area centered on the Kentucky city, consisting of three counties in the Jackson Purchase region of Kentucky and one in southern Illinois

Other 
 Paducah (song), a song recorded by Carmen Miranda and Benny Goodman in 1943.